Məmmədli or Magamedly or Magomedli or Magomedly or Mamedi may refer to:

Məmmədli, Absheron, Azerbaijan
Məmmədli, Barda, Azerbaijan
Məmmədli, Imishli, Azerbaijan
Məmmədli, Kurdamir, Azerbaijan
Lənbəran, Azerbaijan

See also
Mamedli (disambiguation)